Le Happy is a crêperie in northwest Portland, Oregon, United States.

Description
Le Happy is a family-friendly crêperie in the Northwest District of Portland. It is known as a late-night destination, operating from 5pm to 1am Monday through Thursday, 5pm to 2:30am on Friday, and 6pm to 2:30am on Saturday. The exterior features a yellow façade and a string of white lights. Inside is a small kitchen to house a single chef. Interior decorations includes red lights, artificial flowers above the bar, broken eyeglasses affixed to the wall, and votive candles set at tables. Board games are available for use by diners.

The restaurant's menu features both savory and sweet crêpes with a variety of ingredients. Savory options include Ma Provence (chicken, cheeses, tomatoes) and Le Trash Blanc (bacon and cheddar cheese). Other savory ingredients include black beans, cilantro, cucumbers, ham, onions, panang sauce, and tofu. Sweet crêpes include Citron Gingembre, which contains lemon curd and ginger. Other ingredients for sweet crêpes include fruits, berry preserves, semisweet chocolate sauce, and whipped cream. Crêpe meals for children include cheddar cheese and come with a toy. Salads are also available as entrees. Beverages include beer, ciders, cocktails, coffee, juices, teas, and wine.

Community
In 2012, the restaurant contributed food and wine to "Fresh French Shorts", Northwest Film Center's annual showcase of short films by emerging French directors. The series was sponsored by Alliance Française de Portland and screened at the Portland Art Museum. Le Happy has also supported Portland State University's "MFA Monday Night Lecture Series", a series of free public lectures.

Reception
The Portland Mercury described the restaurant's atmosphere as "lively and intimate without feeling crowded" and its food "delicious in every way". Portland Monthly said the crêperie "[masquerades] as a trendy dive bar" and is a "solid late-night option for Northwest nommers". Willamette Week called Le Happy an "ideal balance of sassy and sweet" and said the sweet crêpes "are the ones that really sing". Spin magazine called it a "classy joint" in their "Underground Guide" of the city, which featured local favorites of the Portland-based indie rock band The Thermals.

The crêperie has been featured in several guide books of Portland, including as a "Best Late Night" establishment in Food Lovers' Guide To® Portland, Oregon (2014) and as a recommended French food restaurant in Moon Oregon (2014), which called it a "hipster faux-dive bar". Fodor's said Le Happy can serve as a "romantic dinner-date spot" or a "cozy place" for a drink and snack. Like Spin, the book called the restaurant "classy", but "not without a sense of humor", noting the inclusion of a can of Pabst Blue Ribbon with the Le Trash Blanc. Frommer's Portland Day by Day said the restaurant is "charming" and "seems straight out of a Paris side street". It has also been included in at least one published walking tour of the Northwest District's Slabtown area.

See also
 List of French restaurants

References

External links

 
 Existing Good Neighbor Agreements, Northwest District Association
 French Food in Portland and Around Oregon, International Leadership Academy
 Le Happy, DukeEngage Portland Program

French restaurants in Portland, Oregon
Northwest District, Portland, Oregon